Rosa Radom, also known as HydroTruck Radom for sponsorship reasons, is a Polish professional basketball team based in Radom. The club was founded in 2003 and plays in the I Liga since the 2022–23 season.

History
In the 2011–12 season of the 1 Liga, Rosa Radom reached the Finals but lost 3–1 to Start Gdynia. The team was still promoted to the highest level PLK. In 2016, the team won its first trophy when it upset Stelmet Zielona Góra in the Polish Cup Final, winning 74–64. Rosa's C. J. Harris was named the Cup MVP.

Players

Current roster

Notable players

Honors
Polish League
Winners (0): None
Runner-up (1): 2016
Fourth place (2): 2014, 2015
Polish Cup
Champions (1): 2016
Runner-up (1): 2015
Polish Supercup
Winners (1): 2016

Season by season

References

External links
 Official website 

Basketball teams in Poland
Sport in Radom
Basketball teams established in 2003